This was a tennis rivalry  played between the French player Henri Cochet, and the American player Bill Tilden. In their respective careers the met each other on the court 35 times from 1926 until 1939 it ended with Tilden leading in head to head matches 23-12. In Major championship matches their rivalry ended with Cochet leading Tilden 4-3.

Henri Cochet a former World number 1 and seven-time Grand Slam champion, three-time ITF Major champion and one time Pro Slam champion. Bill Tilden also a former World number 1, a ten-time Grand Slam singles champion, a four-time Pro Slam champion and one-time ILTF Major champion.  Both players were Davis Cup champions Cochet six times and Tilden seven times.

Summary
Cochet and Tildens rivalry began during their amateur careers and ended when they were both professionals. They first met each other in the quarter finals of the 1926 US National Championships with Henri Cochet winning their rivalry debut. Their last meeting was again at the quarter final stage of the 1939 French Pro Championships in which Tilden won. They played each other on four surfaces including grass courts , clay courts, hard courts and wood courts as well as indoors and outdoors. In Grand Slam tournaments they met five times it ended with Cochet ahead 4-1. Curtis (2013) ranked their 1927 Wimbledon semi-final meeting as One of the Ten Most Epic Matches in Tennis History. Whilst American sportswriter Al Laney wrote at the time 'One of the Most Famous Tennis Matches Ever Played'. The 1927 Wimbledon Championships was particularly notable from Cochet's stand point as he played and won three consecutive five-set matches en route to becoming champion despite being two sets to love down in the quarter finals, semi finals and the final.

Head-to-head

Official matches (Cochet 12–23 Tilden)
Included:

(i) denotes indoor tournament.

Breakdown of their rivalry
All matches: Tilden, 23–12
Major matches Cochet, 4–3
All finals: Tied, 2–2
Grand Slam finals: Cochet, 1–0
Clay courts: Tilden, 9–5
Grass courts: Cochet, 3–2
Hard courts: Tilden, 11–4
Wood courts: Tilden, 1–0
Outdoor courts: Tilden, 18-9
Indoor courts: Tilden, 5-3
Davis Cup matches: Cochet, 3-1

See also
List of tennis rivalries

References

Sources
 Association of Tennis Professionals. (2018). Henri Cochet VS Bill Tilden Head 2 Head ATP World Tour "Tennis". ATP World Tour. London, England.
 Baltzell, E. Digby (2013). Sporting Gentlemen: Men's Tennis from the Age of Honor to the Cult of the Superstar. Piscataway, New Jersey, United States: Transaction Publishers. .
 Curtis, Jake (2013). "Ranking the 10 Most Epic Matches in Tennis History". Bleacher Report. Turner Publishing Inc. 
 Garcia, Gabriel (2018). "Jean Borotra -Henri Cochet-Matches Head 2 Head". thetennisbase.com. Madrid, Spain: Tennismem SAL.
 Morris, James; Hegedus, Tomas (2013). "1877 to 2012 Finals Results". www.stevegtennis.com. stevegtennis.

Tennis rivalries